Coniophora elegans is a species of fungi within the Coniophoraceae family.

References 

Coniophoraceae
Fungi described in 1919